The Braddock Carnegie Library in Braddock, Pennsylvania, is the first Carnegie Library in the United States.  As such, the library was named a National Historic Landmark in 2012, following its listing on the National Register of Historic Places in 1973, and is on the Pittsburgh History and Landmarks Foundation's List of Historic Landmarks.

Design, timeline and building
Designed by William Halsey Wood in eclectic medieval style, the library sits on property acquired by Andrew Carnegie with his wife in November, 1885, while existing evidence indicates that the design was approved in March, 1886.  The building was dedicated by Carnegie in person at ceremonies on March 30, 1889.  Circulation of books also began that month. An addition in more Richardson Romanesque style by Longfellow, Alden & Harlow (successors to HH Richardson) followed in 1893.  (Another Halsey Wood design, Yaddo, presently an artists retreat/center in Saratoga Springs NY, is now also a National Historic Landmark.)
  
The Carnegie foundation provided a grant of $357,782 for its construction. (This figure is believed to reflect the total of the 1889 and 1893 structures).  Like some of the other early Carnegie libraries, the building housed various recreational facilities for its users, including billiard tables on the first floor.  (Carnegie was himself quite fond of billiards, which was quite fashionable at the time.)  A bathhouse in the basement, originally accessed by a tunnel under the front entrance, provided Carnegie's millworkers with a place to shower (at a time when indoor plumbing was not the norm) before using the facilities.  Now re-purposed as a pottery studio, the tiled walls and floor remain, suggesting its original purpose.

The 1893 addition approximately doubled the size of the building, and brought many further amenities not usually associated with a library, including a 964-seat Music Hall, a gymnasium, a swimming pool (beneath the Music hall), and a two-lane duckpin alley.  At least in the early years, the athletic/recreational facilities were available to members of the "Carnegie Club" who paid a modest quarterly fee.  Employees of any Carnegie-owned company received a 50% discount, which in 1903 amounted to $1/quarter.

Three sets of decorative cast-iron panels with elements that include a shield and oak leaves are located below the first-floor bay-front windows of the Halsey Wood façade.  While design does not appear to contain any parts of the Braddock or Carnegie family crests, the Braddock family name derives from the Old English 'broad oak' (English oak, Quercus robur) which has leaves similar to those in the panels.  Two specimens of Q robur now flank the entryway steps.

Demise
The Library remained in continuous use from 1889 to 1974, when neglect of the structure and lack of funds for repair, particularly of the roof, forced its closure.  It was slated for demolition in the late 1970s when a group of residents for whom the Library had represented a very positive influence in their youth, organized to save the structure.  Calling themselves the Braddock's Field Historical Society and led by David Solomon, the last librarian, they purchased the building for $1 and took steps to secure the building and attend to the roof. (The Society's name refers to Braddock's Field, the colonial-era name of the area, relating to the Battle of the Monongahela fought on July 9, 1755, a few blocks away).

Rebirth

Initially re-opening a single room as a children's library in 1983, with kerosene heat, the Society slowly but steadily re-occupied the building.  The wood-paneled gym was restored in the early 1990s, and the roof was restored to its original terracotta appearance in 1998, along with the interior walls of the Music Hall, which had suffered substantial water damage from the leaking roof.

Currently, library services for adults have largely moved to the first floor, while a new Children's Library with dedicated staffing opened in March 2012 on the second floor.

In the basement space originally occupied by a bathhouse (for Carnegie's millworkers to clean up before entering upstairs spaces), the Bathhouse Ceramics Studio offers pottery lessons to the community.

Work on the Music Hall continues, with restoration of the floor and the original 1893 Thos. Kane Co. seats the current focus.

In October 2013, the Library inaugurated its Art Lending Collection, which enables patrons to borrow original artwork including life-sized puppets, as part of the 2013 Carnegie International Opening Weekend.

In pop culture
The building has been used in several cinematic productions.  The earliest known, Tony Buba's music video from ~1982 of Frenchy Burrito's cover of the Robert Johnson classic, "Terraplane Blues", was filmed in the gymnasium.  Subsequently, it has served as a Brooklyn police station in the TV movie, The Bride in Black (1990), with Susan Lucci and David Soul; as an orphanage in the TV movie, The Christmas Tree (1996), with Julie Harris, which was Sally Field's directorial debut; and as (separately) a museum and gymnasium in Shelter (2010), with Julianne Moore and Jonathan Rhys-Meyers. In early Dec 2014, the Library was the location for filming sequences of Dr. Bennet Omalu's office in Concussion, with Will Smith and Albert Brooks.

See also
List of Carnegie libraries in Pennsylvania
List of National Historic Landmarks in Pennsylvania
National Register of Historic Places listings in Allegheny County, Pennsylvania

References

Bibliography

Library buildings completed in 1888
Libraries on the National Register of Historic Places in Pennsylvania
Carnegie libraries in Pennsylvania
Libraries in Allegheny County, Pennsylvania
Richardsonian Romanesque architecture in Pennsylvania
Pittsburgh History & Landmarks Foundation Historic Landmarks
National Historic Landmarks in Pennsylvania
1889 establishments in Pennsylvania
Medieval architecture
National Register of Historic Places in Allegheny County, Pennsylvania